Michael L. Morano (October 16, 1915–May 7, 2000) was an American politician and businessman.

Born in Greenwich, Connecticut, he was the owner of a car dealership in Greenwich. He served in the Connecticut House of Representatives from 1960 to 1976 and also in the Connecticut Senate from 1976 to 1988, as a Republican. Morano died at his home in Greenwich, Connecticut, aged 84.

Notes

1915 births
2000 deaths
Businesspeople from Greenwich, Connecticut
Republican Party members of the Connecticut House of Representatives
Republican Party Connecticut state senators
20th-century American politicians
20th-century American businesspeople